Camas Valley is an unincorporated community in Douglas County, Oregon, United States, in the valley of the same name. It is on Oregon Route 42, near the Middle Fork Coquille River.

The name of the valley and the community come from the abundance of Camassia growing in the area; it was an important food source for the local Native Americans. Camas Valley post office was established in July 1870; it has a ZIP code of 97416.

References

Unincorporated communities in Douglas County, Oregon
1870 establishments in Oregon
Populated places established in 1870
Unincorporated communities in Oregon